Kyrgyz-Kyshtak is a village in Batken Region of Kyrgyzstan. It is part of the Kadamjay District. Its population was 5,809 in 2021.

Population

References

Populated places in Batken Region